"(Everybody's Waitin' for) The Man with the Bag" is a Christmas song written in 1950 by Irving Taylor, Dudley Brooks, and Hal Stanley.  The "man with the bag" is a reference to Santa Claus, who drops off presents from his sleigh to people who have been "extra special good".

The song was originally made popular by Kay Starr and regularly appeared on Billboard'''s list of most popular Christmas songs in the early 1950s."There's Christmas in the Air", Billboard, November 29, 1952, p. 29

Hal Stanley was Kay Starr's husband at the time. He had an interest in a club in South-Central Los Angeles where Dudley Brooks often performed, and had collaborated with Irving Taylor on several television projects. He brought the two together, took credit as a co-writer, and published it under his and Starr's publishing company, StarStan.

Versions
The song has been covered by many artists, including The Brian Setzer Orchestra.  The TV show Ally McBeal borrowed the song's title for a December 11, 2000 episode that featured Vonda Shepard singing the song.   Her version was included in the holiday album Ally McBeal: A Very Ally Christmas. The album received positive reviews and several critics cited Shephard's version of the song as the album's highlight.Maestri, Cathy (December 15, 2000) "Overflow of holiday CDs offer good cheer: From pop to country to alternative, there is music for everyone's stockings", The Press-Enterprise (Riverside, California), page AA-13. Jane Monheit recorded the song for her 2005 album The Season, and performed it on her 2019 Holiday tour.   Seth MacFarlane recorded the song for his 2014 album Holiday for Swing''.   The song has also been covered by Voctave, a central Florida a capella group.  

Jessie J covered the song for an advert for Boots during Christmas 2015. The version was released as a single titled "Man with the Bag", and charted on the UK Singles Chart at number 70 in 2020 and number 85 in 2021. It 2022 it was certified Silver by the British Phonographic Industry (BPI).

Darren Criss and Adam Lambert performed a duet of the song for Criss' album, A Very Darren Crissmas.

References 

1950 songs
American Christmas songs
Kay Starr songs
Songs about Santa Claus
Songs written by Irving Taylor (songwriter)